Rosa Cerda (born ) is an Ecuadorian politician elected to the National Assembly of Ecuador. She is in the Pachakutik Plurinational Unity Movement – New Country party.

Life 
Cerda was elected to the National Assembly of Ecuador as a member of the Pachakutik Plurinational Unity Movement – New Country.

In December 2021 her fellow party member, Gissella Molina, was accused by the President, Guillermo Lasso, of taking a bribe to vote against an Investment Law project. Other members mentioned in the accusation included Cerda. Molina denied it and noted that no evidence had been offered to support the accusation.

Cerda did not attend a meeting in May 2022 at the prosecutors office in Quito to hear the case brought by Guillermo Lasso. Cerda's lawyer Gonzalo Realpe said that Cerda would not attend and that another of the accused, Édgar Quezada, would also not attend his hearing the following day.

References

Living people
Members of the National Assembly (Ecuador)
Women members of the National Assembly (Ecuador)
Year of birth missing (living people)
21st-century Ecuadorian politicians
21st-century Ecuadorian women politicians